UFC Fight Night: Hendricks vs. Thompson (also known as UFC Fight Night 82) was a mixed martial arts event held on February 6, 2016, at the MGM Grand Garden Arena in Las Vegas, Nevada.

Background
The event was originally billed as UFC 196 and was scheduled to be headlined by a UFC Heavyweight Championship rematch between then-current champion Fabrício Werdum and former two-time champion Cain Velasquez. A series of events eventually led to a main event shuffle: on January 24, 13 days before the event, Velasquez pulled out of the bout due to a back injury and was replaced by Stipe Miocic. On the following day, Werdum announced that he was pulling out of the event due to injury as well as he was not comfortable with the opponent change while dealing with injuries of his own.

With no viable main event options remaining, on January 26 UFC President Dana White announced the company was canceling the pay-per-view broadcast. Therefore, UFC 196 became a Fight Night card. The event aired on Fox Sports 1 and was headlined by a five-round welterweight bout between former UFC Welterweight Champion Johny Hendricks and five-time kickboxing world champion Stephen Thompson. The two were originally scheduled to meet in the co-main event.

A welterweight bout between former WEC Welterweight Champion Mike Pyle and Sean Spencer was originally booked for UFC 187. However, Spencer pulled out due to injury. The fight was later rescheduled for this event.

Mickey Gall, whose first pro bout and subsequent call-out of former WWE Champion CM Punk were featured on UFC Fight Pass' Lookin' for a Fight reality show, faced fellow newcomer Mike Jackson. With his win, Gall was able to secure the matchup with Punk, which eventually took place in September 2016 at UFC 203.

Results

Bonus awards
The following fighters were awarded $50,000 bonuses:
Fight of the Night: Mike Pyle vs. Sean Spencer
Performance of the Night: Stephen Thompson and Diego Rivas

Reported payout
The following is the reported payout to the fighters as reported to the Nevada State Athletic Commission. It does not include sponsor money and also does not include the UFC's traditional "fight night" bonuses.
 Stephen Thompson: $48,000 (includes $24,000 win bonus) def. Johny Hendricks: $100,000
 Roy Nelson: $125,000 (includes $50,000 win bonus) def. Jared Rosholt: $33,000
 Ovince Saint Preux: $102,000 (includes $51,000 win bonus) def. Rafael Cavalcante: $42,000
 Joseph Benavidez: $118,000 (includes $59,000 win bonus) def. Zach Makovsky: $19,000
 Misha Cirkunov: $24,000 (includes $12,000 win bonus) def. Alex Nicholson: $10,000
 Mike Pyle: $106,000 (includes $53,000 win bonus) def. Sean Spencer: $17,000
 Josh Burkman: $90,000 (includes $45,000 win bonus) def. K. J. Noons: $34,000
 Derrick Lewis: $50,000 (includes $25,000 win bonus) def. Damian Grabowski: $17,000
 Justin Scoggins: $34,000 (includes $17,000 win bonus) def. Ray Borg: $18,000
 Diego Rivas: $20,000 (includes $10,000 win bonus) def. Noad Lahat: $17,000
 Mickey Gall: $20,000 (includes $10,000 win bonus) def. Mike Jackson: $10,000
 Alex White: $24,000 (includes $12,000 win bonus) def. Artem Lobov: $13,000

See also
List of UFC events
2016 in UFC

References

UFC Fight Night
2016 in mixed martial arts
Mixed martial arts in Las Vegas
2016 in sports in Nevada
MGM Grand Garden Arena
February 2016 sports events in the United States